Wade Istchenko is a Canadian politician, who was elected to in the Yukon Legislative Assembly in the 2011 and 2016 elections. A former cabinet minister, he currently represents the rural Yukon district of Kluane as a member of the opposition Yukon Party caucus.

Political career

33rd Assembly

Istchenko was elected in November 2011 as a member of the Yukon Party caucus in the rural Yukon riding of Kluane. The riding had been held since 1996 by long-time New Democrat-turned-Liberal Gary McRobb, who had retired that year. Istchenko was sworn in as a member of the Executive Council (Cabinet) of Premier Darrell Pasloski on November 5, 2011, and served as Minister of Highways and Public Works until being appointed Minister of Environment in January 2015. During the 33rd Legislative Assembly, he also served as a member of the Standing Committee on Statutory Instruments.

Shortly before being sworn into Cabinet, Istchenko made headlines when he admitted to falsifying documents in 2008 to obtain a wilderness tourism operator permit. He apologized, and cited the incident as a lapse in judgment and admitted to paying a fine.

Istchenko once again drew controversy in 2015, this time after a photo emerged of him drinking a beer while in the driver's seat of a parked all-terrain vehicle. He later apologized for the incident.

34th Assembly

Istchenko was re-elected in the 2016 Yukon election for the district of Kluane, defeating former Kluane First Nation chief and Liberal candidate Mathieya Alatini. The Yukon Party  was defeated by the Yukon Liberal Party in that election, however, so Istchenko returned to the legislature as a member of the Opposition. He is currently the Yukon Party caucus critic for the Department of Environment, the Yukon Housing Corporation, the Yukon Liquor Corporation (including the Yukon Lottery Commission), the Yukon Energy Corporation and the Yukon Development Corporation. He is also a member of the Standing Committee on Public Accounts.

Personal life

Istchenko was born in Whitehorse and raised in Haines Junction, where he currently lives. He is a veteran of the Canadian Armed Forces, which he joined in 1984, and served with NATO in Germany. He continues to be active in the Canadian Rangers as a Ranger Sergeant.

Prior to entering the politics, Istchenko ran an outdoor adventure company, Kluane Ridin' Adventure Tours. He also served on the Kluane Park Management Board.

Istchenko is the grandson of Hilda Watson, former MLA for the same electoral district of Kluane, and the first woman to lead a political party in Canada.

Electoral record

2021 general election

2016 general election

|-

| Liberal
| Mathieya Alatini
| align="right"| 289
| align="right"| 37.1%
| align="right"| +8.1%

| NDP
| Sally Wright
| align="right"| 153
| align="right"| 19.2%
| align="right"| -9.8%
|-
! align=left colspan=3|Total
! align=right| 780
! align=right| 100.0%
! align=right| –
|}

2011 general election

|-

| NDP
| Eric Stinson
| align="right"| 220
| align="right"| 29.0%
| align="right"| +15.2%

| Liberal
| Timothy Cant
| align="right"| 219
| align="right"| 28.9%
| align="right"| -24.4%

|-
! align=left colspan=3|Total
! align=right| 759
! align=right| 100.0%
! align=right| –
|}

References

Yukon Party MLAs
Living people
21st-century Canadian politicians
Year of birth missing (living people)
Members of the Executive Council of Yukon